Kashani Island is a small uninhabited island located close to the shore of the Tanzanian island of Pemba.
The Island is merely 300 meters long and 1 kilometer wide, and is known mainly for the snorkeling spots around it.
Estimated terrain elevation above sea level is 4 meters.

Coastal islands of Tanzania